West Virginia Route 36 is a north–south state highway in West Virginia. The southern terminus of the route is at West Virginia Route 4 in Maysel. The northern terminus is at U.S. Route 119 in Spencer.

Major intersections

References

036
Transportation in Clay County, West Virginia
Transportation in Roane County, West Virginia